Penguin Land, known as  in Japan, is a 1987 puzzle-platform game published and developed by Sega for the Master System. It is the second game in the Doki Doki Penguin Land series. The player controls a penguin to guide an egg around polar bears, rocks and other hazards.  There are 50 stages and a level editor which can save up to 15 additional levels. The level editor data is stored on the game's battery back-up RAM. Penguin Land was the first home console video game to include a battery backup save feature being released four days prior to The Legend of Zelda in the US.

Plot
The game begins where three penguin eggs are lost on a distant planet. The player controls the Penguin Mission Commander Overbite, who must guide these eggs down to the bottom of a frigid cavern filled with traps, enemies, and secret passages. The Spaceship Crew eagerly awaits at the bottom of this cavern to welcome the hero Overbite and carry the eggs to safety.

Gameplay
The object of the game is to successfully push and drop an egg down to the bottom of a vertically scrolling cavern of ice. The player is able to push the egg left and right, push it off cliffs onto lower platforms, and melt ice blocks to create a passage for the egg. If the egg falls more than 3 blocks downward, it will break. Also, if Overbite lands on the egg, but the egg cannot be rolled left or right, the egg will break. The round is completed when the egg is successfully delivered to the bottom of the level.

The block types in the game include ice blocks (which the player can melt), cracked ice (which will melt once the egg is on top of them), Rocks (which can be pushed and dropped on enemies, but will crack the egg if they land on it), stone blocks (which cannot be moved by the player, but occasionally move on their own), and tubes for either the egg or the player to pass through.

Gangows are polar bear-like enemies that will attack both the player and the egg. If they back the egg into a corner or land on the egg, it will break. Cameels are birds that fly by if the egg is not moved after a set time. They will drop a brick which can crack the egg.

Also included are point and time bonuses, egg shields, springs that let you jump higher, and ghosts that invert game controls. Point bonuses are awarded for crushing Gangows, time remaining, and the difficulty of the round completed.

Reception
The game was reviewed in 1988 in Dragon #140 by Hartley, Patricia, and Kirk Lesser in "The Role of Computers" column. The reviewers gave the game 3 out of 5 stars.

Reviews
Sega Power (Dec, 1993)
Joystick (German) (Jan, 1989)
The Games Machine (Oct, 1988)
Power Play (Oct, 1988)
Computer and Video Games (Oct, 1988)

References

External links

1987 video games
Fictional penguins
Platform games
Pony Canyon games
Puzzle video games
Sega video games
Master System games
Master System-only games
Video games about birds
Video games developed in Japan
Single-player video games